Mehboob Alam Kotwal (credited as Mehboob Kotwal or simply Mehboob; born 1961 in Bandra West, Mumbai) is a Bollywood film lyricist. He was brought up in Mumbai city of Maharashtra, where he also received his primary education, first in English and later in Urdu.

Career
In 1986, Mehboob met music composer Ismail Darbar who played violin in film orchestras those days. It was Darbar who taught him the difference between poetry and film lyrics. Darbar introduced Mehboob to filmmaker Ram Gopal Varma and he began  his song writing career with Varma's 1992 film Drohi whose music was composed by R.D. Burman. He then worked with A.R. Rahman on Varma's Rangeela. Rahman liked his work and introduced him to Mani Ratnam and Mehboob penned the lyrics for the Hindi (dubbed) version of Bombay. Mehboob went on to work with A.R. Rahman on films such as Thakshak, Doli Saja Ke Rakhna and Dubbed version of Dil Hi Dil Mein. He has also written lyrics for A.R. Rahman's non-film album Maa Tujhe Salaam as well as Mani Ratnam's Yuva.

Mehboob has collaborated with Ismail Darbar on Sanjay Leela Bhansali's 1999 film Hum Dil De Chuke Sanam, and on Shakti - The Power in 2002. He has also written the lyrics for Kamaal Khan's Hindi pop album "Kal Raat" (2003) and KK's albums - Pal and Humsafar.

Filmography
Drohi (1992)
Rangeela (1995)
Bombay (1995; Hindi dubbed version)
Yash (1996)
Daud (1997)
Iruvar (1997; Hindi dubbed version)
Vande Mataram (1997, Non-film album)
Doli Saja Ke Rakhna (1998)
Trishakti (1999)
Thakshak (1999)
Rockford (1999)
Hum Dil De Chuke Sanam (1999)
Dil Hi Dil Mein (1999; Hindi dubbed version)
Khauff (2000)
One 2 Ka 4 (2001)
Yeh Raaste Hain Pyaar Ke (2001)
Grahan (2001)
Bas Itna Sa Khwaab Hai (2001)
Desh Devi (2002)
Shakti - The Power (2002)
Baaz: A Bird in Danger (2003)
Tujhe Meri Kasam (2003)
Calcutta Mail (2003)
Lakeer – Forbidden Lines (2004)
Uff Kya Jaadoo Mohabbat Hai (2004)
Yuva (2004)
Anniyan (2005; Hindi dubbed version)
Dil Ne Jise Apna Kaha (2006)
Holiday (2006)
Iqraar by Chance (2006)
Halla Bol (2008)
Ek Chalis Ki Last Local (2007)
Apna Asmaan (2007)
Contract (2008)
Tahaan (2008)
Halla Bol (2008)
Sirf (2008)
Lamhaa (2010)
Muskurake Dekh Zara (2010)
Itra (2015)
Heropanti 2 (2021)
Ponniyin Selvan: I (2022, Hindi dubbed version)

Selected songs
One 2 Ka Four
Khamoshiyaa gungunane lagi

Bombay
Tu hi re
Hamma hamma
Kehna hi kya
Kuchi Kuchi rakkama

Yash (1996 film)
Yaaron na jane mujhe kya ho gaya
Subah subah jab khidki khole

Daud
O bhavare

Dil Hi Dil Mein
Ae Nansen suno na
Dola dola

Doli Saja Ke Rakhna
Tar pum tar pum
Kissa hum likhnege

Hum Dil De Chuke Sanam
Chaand chuppa
Nimbooda Nimbooda
Tadap Tadap
Dholi Taro Dhol Baaje
Aankhon ki Gustakhiyaan
Jhonka hawa ka

Rangeela
Tanha Tanha
Pyaar yeh jane kaisa

Thakshak
Rang de
Khamosh raat

Vande Mataram
Maa tujhe salaam

Yuva
Khuda hafiz
Fanna Fanna
Dhakka lagga bhukka

Awards
 1996: Filmfare RD Burman Award for New Music Talent - Rangeela

References

External links

Musicians from Mumbai
Marathi-language poets
Indian male songwriters
Living people
1953 births